Offinso North District is one of the forty-three districts in Ashanti Region, Ghana. Originally it was formerly part of the then-larger Offinso District in 1988, which it was created from the former Offinso District Council; until the northern part of the district was split off by a decree of then-president John Agyekum Kufuor to create Offinso North District on 29 February 2008; while the remaining part has since then been renamed as Offinso Municipal District, which was elevated to municipal district assembly status on the same year. The district assembly is located in the northern part of Ashanti Region and has Akomadan as its capital town.

Sources
 
 GhanaDistricts.com

References

Districts of Ashanti Region